Motte Saint-Albe is a medieval castle hill in Gradignan, Gironde, Nouvelle-Aquitaine, France. Nothing remains of the castle or tower that was situated on the motte.

Ruined castles in Nouvelle-Aquitaine
Buildings and structures in Gironde